Ri Kŭm-ch'ŏl (born 18 May 1987) is a North Korean international football midfielder, playing club football with Wŏlmido of the DPR Korea League

Goals for Senior National Team

References

1987 births
Living people
North Korean footballers
North Korea international footballers
2019 AFC Asian Cup players
Wolmido Sports Club players
Association football forwards
Association football midfielders